Bidens tripartita is a common and widespread species of flowering plant in the sunflower family, Asteraceae, commonly known as three-lobe beggarticks, three-part beggarticks, leafy-bracted beggarticks or trifid bur-marigold. It is native to much of Eurasia, North Africa, and North America, with naturalized populations in Australia and on some Pacific Islands.

Distribution and abundance 
Bidens tripartita is native to much of Eurasia, North Africa, and North America, with naturalized populations in Australia and on some Pacific Islands. Bidens tripartita is considered relatively rare in southwestern British Columbia and was likely introduced from eastern North America and Europe.

Morphology 
Bidens tripartita is an annual species with rigid stems and fibrous roots. Leaves are often deeply lobed. Flower heads are discoid and lacking ray flowers. Fruits are achenes.

Subspecies and varieties 
 Bidens tripartita subsp. bullatus (L.) Rouy  
 Bidens tripartita var. repens (D.Don) Sherff 	 
 Bidens tripartita subsp. tripartita  
 Bidens tripartita var. tripartita

Photo gallery

References

External links

tripartita
Flora of Asia
Flora of Europe
Flora of North Africa
Flora of North America
Plants described in 1753
Taxa named by Carl Linnaeus